Ricky Jackson (born 19 June 1967) is a former Australian rules footballer who played for Melbourne in the Victorian Football League/Australian Football League (VFL/AFL).

Jackson tried out initially at Richmond but the rover was not wanted by the club due to his size. Despite this rejection, he had a successful career with Melbourne where he became a handy goal scorer and topped their goal-kicking in 1988 with 43 goals. Most notably he kicked five goals in Melbourne's Preliminary Final win over Carlton that year, although he went goal-less from the forward pocket in their Grand Final loss.

A Victorian interstate representative, Jackson was picked up by Footscray in the 1991 AFL draft but did not break into their seniors. He represented Australia in the 1990 International Rules series.

References

Holmesby, Russell and Main, Jim (2007). The Encyclopedia of AFL Footballers. 7th ed. Melbourne: Bas Publishing.

1967 births
Living people
Australian rules footballers from Victoria (Australia)
Melbourne Football Club players
Ormond Amateur Football Club players
Australia international rules football team players